Jones Cut is one of the cuts on the Lackawanna Cut-Off railroad line in northwest New Jersey.  

Located near milepost 64.8 in Blairstown Township, the cut was constructed between 1908 and 1911 by contractor Hyde, McFarlan & Burke.  Some 578,000 cubic yards of fill material was removed by blasting with dynamite or other methods.  Jones Cut is located on a tangent (straight) section of track, permitting speeds of 80 mph (129 km/hr).  Blairstown Station sits within the cut.

Jones Cut is named for William Jones, who was the principal owner of the land that was acquired for this cut.

References 

Lackawanna Cut-Off